Slow Water is a 2003 novel by New Zealand author Annamarie Jagose.

Notes
"Dedication: For Lee".

Awards
Miles Franklin Literary Award, 2004: shortlisted 
Victorian Premier's Literary Award, The Vance Palmer Prize for Fiction, 2004: winner 
Montana New Zealand Book Awards, Deutz Medal For Fiction, 2004: winner

External links

Reviews
 "Sydney Morning Herald"

2003 Australian novels
21st-century New Zealand novels
2003 novels